Dmitry Kirillov (born 15 May 1968) is a Belarusian male curler and curling coach.

Teams and events

Men's

Mixed

Mixed doubles

Coaching (national teams)

References

External links
 
 

1968 births
Living people
Belarusian male curlers

Belarusian curling coaches